The Malayan Communist Party (MCP), officially the Communist Party of Malaya (CPM), was a Marxist–Leninist and anti-imperialist communist party which was active in British Malaya and later, the modern states of Malaysia and Singapore from 1930 to 1989. It was responsible for the creation of both the Malayan Peoples' Anti-Japanese Army and the Malayan National Liberation Army.

The party led resistance efforts against the Japanese occupation of Malaya and Singapore during World War II, and later fought a war of national liberation against the British Empire during the Malayan Emergency. After the departure of British colonial forces from the Federation of Malaya, the party fought in a third guerrilla campaign against both the Malaysian and Singaporean governments in an attempt to create a communist state in the region, before disbanding in 1989. Today, due to historical connotations surrounding the MCP, communism as an ideology remains a taboo political topic in both countries.

History

Formation
In April 1930 the South Seas Communist Party was dissolved and was replaced by the Communist Party of Malaya. While its primary responsibility was Malaya and Singapore, the party was also active in Thailand and the Dutch East Indies, which did not then have their own Communist parties.

Growth
The party operated as an illegal organisation under British colonial rule. On 29 April 1930, a raid conducted by the Singapore Special Branch on a vacant house at 24 Nassim Road in Singapore almost ended the MCP as eight of its original founding members were arrested before being imprisoned or deported back to China. In June 1931, after a Comintern courier was intercepted by the police, about six raids were conducted from June to December saw several party members were arrested and documents seized, sending the party into disarray. Information extracted from the courier indicated at this point there were 1,500 members and 10,000 sympathisers.

Despite this setback, the MCP gained influence in the trade union movement and organised several strikes, most notably at the Batu Arang coal mine in 1935. They also set up workers' committees at some workplaces. These committees, and the strikes, were promptly crushed by troops and police. Many ethnic Chinese strikers were deported to China, where they were often executed by the Chinese Nationalist government as Communists.

After Japan invaded China in 1937, there was a rapprochement between the Malayan Kuomintang and Communists, paralleling that in China. Under the wing of the Kuomintang, the MCP was able to operate more easily. Anti-Japanese sentiment among Malayan Chinese gave the party a great opportunity to recruit members and raise funds under the banner of defence of China.

At this time, the party was infiltrated by an apparent British agent, Lai Teck, who became its Secretary-General in April 1939. Despite this severe security breach, the Party continued to operate effectively. By mid-1939 it claimed about 40,000 members, about half in Singapore.

Structure
The MCP was headed by a Central Executive Committee of twelve to fifteen members. About six of these were appointed to the Political Bureau (Politburo) which ran the party when the C.E.C was not in session. Each State had State Central Executive Committee and was in turn subdivided into several Districts. The smallest unit of organisation was the Party cell, which typically consisted of the members from one workplace or village. Large Party Congresses were held on an occasional basis.

World War II
On 8 December 1941, the Japanese Empire invaded Malaya. The British colonial authorities now accepted the MCP's standing offer of military co-operation. On 15 December, all left-wing political prisoners were released.

From 20 December the British military began to train party members in guerilla warfare at the hastily established 101st Special Training School (101st STS) in Singapore. About 165 MCP members were trained before the British defences collapsed. These fighters, scantily armed and equipped by the hard-pressed British, hurriedly dispersed and attempted to harass the occupying army.

Just before Singapore fell to the Japanese on 15 February 1942, the party began organising armed resistance in the state of Johore. Soon four armed groups, which became known as 'Regiments', were formed, with 101st STS trainees serving as nuclei. In March this force was dubbed the Malayan People's Anti-Japanese Army (MPAJA) and began sabotage and ambushes against the Japanese. The Japanese responded with reprisals against Chinese civilians. These reprisals, coupled with increasing economic hardship, caused large numbers of Malayan Chinese to flee the cities. They became squatters at the forest margins, where they became the main source of recruits, food, and other assistance for the MPAJA. The MPAJA consolidated this support by providing protection.

O'Ballance estimates that in mid-1942 the regimental strengths were about 100 in the first Regiment, 160 in the 2nd, 360 in the 3rd, and 250 in the 4th. At this time a 5th, 6th, and 7th Regiment were formed. This army, which included women, was conceived as both a military and political force, along Maoist lines.

When Singapore fell, Lai Teck was arrested by the Japanese and became their agent. On 1 September 1942, acting on his information, the Japanese launched a dawn raid on a secret conference of more than 100 MCP and MPAJA leaders at the Batu Caves just north of Kuala Lumpur, killing most. The loss of personnel forced the MPAJA to abandon its political commissar system, and the military commanders became the heads of the regiments. Following this setback the MPAJA avoided engagements and concentrated on consolidation, amassing 4,500 soldiers by Spring 1943.

From May 1943, British commandos from Force 136 infiltrated Malaya and made contact with the guerillas. Early in 1944 an agreement was reached whereby the MPAJA would accept some direction from the Allied South East Asia Command (SEAC) and the Allies would give the MPAJA weapons and supplies. It was not until the spring of 1945, however, that significant amounts of material began to arrive by air drop.

The war's aftermath
Japan's surrender on 15 August 1945 caught the combatants in Malaya by surprise. The first British contingent of reoccupation troops did not arrive until 3 September; Singapore was reoccupied only on the 8th. The Japanese garrison withdrew from the countryside, leaving a power vacuum that was filled by the MPAJA. In many places, especially Chinese areas, they were greeted as heroes as they emerged from the forest.

The British recognised the MPAJA's authority, paying its soldiers for the role in the reoccupation. The guerillas, meanwhile, seized Japanese arms and recruited freely, forming an 8th Regiment and lifting their armed strength over 6,000. At the same time they launched reprisals against collaborators in the Malay police force and the civilian population and began to forcibly raise funds.

Many in the rank and file advocated revolution. The cautious approach which was favoured by Lai Teck and a majority of the leadership prevailed—a decision which was later viewed as a major missed opportunity.

On 12 September the British Military Administration (BMA) was installed at Kuala Lumpur. Later that year MPAJA reluctantly agreed to disband. Weapons were handed in at ceremonies where the wartime role of the army was praised. Six thousand eight-hundred soldiers were officially disbanded, but a proportion of weapons were withheld, particularly handguns. The party was still not legal but able to operate without repression.

The MCP adopted a 'National Front' policy, building a broad coalition to work for national independence within legal means. Due to bad economic conditions, the BMA was immediately faced with strikes and demonstrations in which the Communists played an active part. Several were put down by armed force and leaders banished. The MCP also exerted influence through parliamentary parties such as the Malayan Democratic Union (MDU) and the Malay Nationalist Party (MNP).

In 1946, amid a discontent with the leadership's cautious line, an investigation commenced into rumours of Lai Teck's treachery. Before he could be questioned in March 1947, Lai Teck fled the country with party funds. Badly shaken, the Central Executive Committee kept the defection secret for a year while they struggled to come to terms with it. The 26-year-old Chin Peng was chosen as the new Secretary General. A senior officer in the MPAJA 5th Regiment in Perak, he had been the party's principal liaison with Force 136. The party's stance became more resolutely anti-British.

Malayan Emergency

Amid a rising atmosphere of tension, the government outlawed the burgeoning trade union federations on 12 June 1948. Then on 16 June they declared a state of emergency after three European planters were murdered by Communists in Perak state. The police were given sweeping powers of arrest, and punishments including the death penalty could be administered without an ordinary trial.

In the two weeks following hundreds of MCP members were arrested, and the party was declared illegal on 23 July. Party militants regrouped in the jungle as the Malayan Peoples' Anti-British Army (MPABA), many ex-MPAJA personnel. The initial commander, Lau Yew, was killed in action on 16 July. Chin Peng narrowly escaped arrest and rejoined his comrades with difficulty.

During this period the MCP also engaged in intimidation, including assassination, of civilians with the aim of coercing material aid, information, and silence. This policy contributed to a loss in popular support and was repudiated by the CEC in September 1951.

On 1 February 1949 the MPABA changed its name to 'Malayan National Liberation Army' (MNLA) and The party began to campaign for a Peoples' Democratic Republic of Malaya, which included Singapore.

The MPLA had a General Headquarters controlled by a Central Military Committee which consisted of the politburo and some of the MPLA's regimental commanders and political officers. The most influential members of the politburo were Chin Peng, Yeung Kwo and Lau Lee. At this point the army had about 4000 soldiers, about 10% women. It was divided into ten Regiments, nine of which were predominantly Chinese and one of which was composed mostly of Malays and Indians. The latter was successfully eliminated by the British who wished to confine the insurgency to the Chinese community.

A civilian organisation called the Min Yuen supported the MPLA, collecting supplies and information.

The MPLA lived in jungle or forest camps similar to—or even the same as—to those which the MPAJA had used. By mid 1950 they, with the help of the Min Yuen, had acquired uniforms. These were of either khaki or jungle green British pattern. The MPAJA and MPLA usually wore three stars on their caps, signifying the three races of Malaya.

Road or rail ambushes were favoured by the guerrillas, averaging about 17 per month from September 1949 to February 1950, and 56 per month from then until September 1950, peaking at 100 in the latter month.

To prevent peasants, particularly squatters, from aiding the guerrillas, the British commenced relocation, which became a major component of British strategy under the Briggs Plan of 1950. By the mid-1950s about 500,000 people (roughly 10% of Malaya's population) had been moved into compounds, termed 'New Villages', which were surrounded by high barbed wire fences and guarded by police. On mines and estates, employees did not face relocation but merely 'regroupment' into guarded compounds on site. About 650,000 people were regrouped in this manner.

In addition, in June 1951, a general food-control program called 'Operation Starvation' was instituted. In 'food restricted areas', eating was only permitted at home, not at cafes and restaurants or workplaces. Shop keepers had to keep strict account of all food sold, and canned goods had to be punctured at time of sale to necessitate their being used promptly. Widespread burning of villages suspected of Communist sympathies was also common in the early years.

As a military strategy, these restrictive measures were highly successful. By 1953 the MPLA was often short of food and its numbers declined. Faced with failure to establish any 'Liberated Areas', MCP renewed its work with trade unions and political parties. The MPLA, for its part, began to increasingly rely on Malaya's aboriginal population for support. Internment of Aborigines was abandoned after mass deaths, and the government instead adopted strategy of offering the aborigines' aid and building forts in aborigine territory.

In July 1955 Malaya's first general elections took place, with Tunku Abdul Rahman becoming Chief Minister. One of his first acts was to declare a partial amnesty. The amnesty remained in place until 8 February 1956 but resulted in only 73 surrenders.

On 24 September 1955 Chin Peng wrote to Rahman offering to negotiate peace. This was accepted and on 17 October two government representatives, Too Joon Hing, an Assistant Minister of Education, and I.S. Wylie, the Deputy Commissioner of the Federation police, met Chin Peng and another member of the MCP Central Executive Committee at Klian Intan. Two further meetings followed in November.

On 24 December the MCP released a new 'Eight Point Program' which called for an end to the Emergency Regulations, a cessation of hostilities, reform of Malaya's political system, democratic rights, support for world peace, and attention to other matters including education, health, welfare, and industrial production.

The negotiations culminated in the Baling meeting on 28 and 29 December 1955. Representing the Government were Tunku Abdul Rahman, David Marshall, Chief Minister of Singapore, and Sir Cheng Lock Tan, leader of the Malayan Chinese Association (MCA). For the MCP were Chin Peng Chen Tian, and Abdul Rashid bin Maidin. Chin Peng wanted legal recognition of the MCP and a return to the pre-conflict situation. The Government demanded the dissolution of the MCP, and the talks broke down.

In 1956 Chin Peng wrote to Tunku Abdul Rahman offering to resume negotiations. This was rejected by Rahman in a broadcast on 2 April.

In April 1957, Hor Lung, a Politburo member in charge of the Southern operations of the MPLA since 1953, was bribed to surrender to the security forces.

By July 1957, about 30,000 square miles (approximately 78,000 km²) out of Malaya's total area of 50,850 square miles (approximately 130,000 km²) had been declared by the government as 'White Areas' – areas where the MPLA had essentially been eliminated and the Emergency Regulations withdrawn. In August 1957, Kuala Lumpur and district were declared 'White'. By mid 1958 the MPLA existed mainly in Perak and the Southern part of Johore. By early 1959 the MPLA was active only around the Thai border.

Meanwhile, on 31 August 1957, Malaya became independent from Britain. Tunku Abdul Rahman became Prime Minister. The Director of Operations against the insurrection, however, remained a British General, namely Lieutenant-General Archibald Cassels.

On 31 July 1960 the government formally declared that the 'Emergency' was over. However, Emergency restrictions remained in place in the area near the Thailand border.

Post-1960 period

In the mid 1960s the US State Department estimated the party membership to be approximately 2000.

The Communist guerrilla force, with a strength of about 500, continued to subsist on either side of the Thailand border. Meanwhile, Chin Peng and other cadre in China had limited contact with the jungle bases. From 1969 they launched a radio station in Hunan called "Suara Revolusi Malaya" (Voice of the Malayan Revolution), broadcasting to supporters in Malaysia and Singapore. This was shut down in 1981 at the request of Deng Xiaoping.

Also in 1969, in response to the intensification of the Vietnam War and the Cultural Revolution in China, the party stepped up armed struggle. In 1970, however, the bases in Thailand were convulsed by the trials and executions of supposed spies. Two breakaway factions formed which condemned the purge. Chin Peng subsequently denied involvement and rehabilitated his accused comrades.

In 1989, the CPM finally laid down its arms. On 2 December, at the town of Had Yai in Southern Thailand, Chin Peng, Rashid Maidin, and Abdullah C. D. met with representatives of the Malaysian and Thai governments. Separate peace agreements were signed between the CPM and both governments.

MCP manifestos

From time to time the MCP released policy statements or manifestos to the public.

 1940. Manifesto calling for expulsion of British imperialism.
 February 1943. Anti-Japanese Programme (nine points).
 27 August 1945. Eight Point Manifesto. Generally moderate; the only demands objected to by the British were those for an elected assembly and a wide franchise. It "expressed the hope" (Cheah's words) that the British would consider granting self-government to Malaya.
 7 November 1945. MCP put six proposals to the BMA. At least one of them went beyond 27 August points: a demand for self-government. This included asking that Malaya be allowed to control its own national defence and foreign relations. Other demands were for less government interference with freedom of speech, publication and assembly, increases of wages, and an end to restrictions on trade, travel and transportation.

MCP newspapers
 Charn Yew Pau (‘Combattants' Friend’). Published for the MPAJA Ex-Service Comrades.
 MCP Review. Was active in at least May 1948, when it carried a feature on the 'Peasants Struggle in Perak'.
 Min Pao. Published in Seremban. It was closed by the government in 1946.
 Min Sheng Pau. Has been called the 'voice of the MCP'. It was Malaya's largest Chinese-language daily newspaper. In early June 1948 it tried to move its printing machinery and newsprint into the jungle. It was the MCP's largest financial asset on the peninsula. Its editor, Liew Yit Fan, was arrested 9 June 1948 for sedition.
 Sin Min Chu ('New Democracy'). Founded late 1945 or early 1946.

Prominent members
 Chin Peng. Secretary-General from 1947 to his death in 2013.
 Lai Teck (Loi Tak). Secretary-General from 1939 to 1947. British and Japanese triple agent.
 Wahi Annuar (Anwar). Took to the forests at the beginning of the emergency. Was a leader in the MPLA 10th Regiment. Surrendered in February 1950.
 R. G. Balan. Was in MPAJA. Attended Empire Communist Conference in London. Organised the Perak Rubber Labourers Union after his return from the Conference (c. 1948). It was a rival to John Emmanuel's government-sponsored faction of the Perak Estates Employees Union. Balan's union was very active from the beginning of 1948 until the emergency was declared. Balan was arrested 30 or 31 May 1948.
 Abdullah CD. May also have been in the Malay Nationalist Party (MNP). Went into the jungle when the emergency was instituted. One of the three MCP signatories at Hat Yai, 1989.
 Shamsiah Fakeh. the leader of Angkatan Wanita Sedar (AWAS), Malaysia's first nationalist women's organisation and a prominent Malay leader of the Communist Party of Malaya.
 Suriani Abdullah. Member of Perak State organisation and wife of Abdullah CD. In November 1945, she defended Lai Teck against rumours of disloyalty.
 S. A. Ganapathy. Before World War II, he was a member of the Indian Communist Party, Malaya. During the period of Japanese rule, he joined the Indian National Army (INA). While in the INA he resumed his Communist affiliation and late in the War was arrested by the Japanese for Communist propagandising. After the War, he became President of the Pan Malayan General Labour Union (PMGLU), and President of the Pan Malayan Federation of Trade Unions (PMFTU). At the beginning of the emergency, he joined the guerrilla. He was arrested in May 1949 and hanged for possession of a pistol.
 Yeong Kuo. Head of the Organisation Committee around 1946. Member of the Central Standing Committee (State C.E.C.?) from Selangor. Played a large role in the investigation against Lai Teck.
 Lau Mah. Aliases: Ah Chung, Chin Wei Seong. Secretary of MPAJA 5th Regiment, Perak, in at least 1945. Member of the MCP Central Executive Committee. Killed by security forces in Perak, December 1949.
 Lau Yew (Liu Yau). Probably the MCP's most skilled military commander. Chairman of the Central Military Committee of the MPAJA. President of the MPAJA Ex-Service Comrades Association. Head of the MPABA. Killed by government forces in Selangor, 16 July 1948.
 Lee Soong (Lee Siong). MCP representative at the Calcutta Youth Conference, 1948.
 Liew Yit Fan. Political Secretary of MPAJA 2nd Regiment. 'Open' representative of MCP in mid 1947. Editor of Min Sheng Pao, largest Chinese-language newspaper in the Federation. Arrested 9 June 1948 for sedition.
 Lin Ah Liang. Head of the Singapore branch of the MCP in at least 1946.
 Chen Tien. Head of the MCP's Central Propaganda Department and a representative of MCP during the Baling Talks
 Abdul Rashid bin Maidin. Attended the 'Empire' communist conference in London. May have met Ahmad Boestaman in May and early June 1948 to plan an insurrection to begin in 1950. Arrested at the beginning of the emergency but sprung from a camp in Malacca. One of the three MCP signatories at Hat Yai, 1989.
 Soon Kwong. General Secretary of the Selangor MPAJU. He was arrested on 12 October 1945 and charged with extortion committed 10 September 1945. His arrest, and to a lesser extent that of several MPAJA and MPAJU officials before that, prompted a large anti-government demonstration.
 Wu Tian Wang. MCP representative on the British-convoked Singapore Advisory Council, 1945.
 Eu Chooi Yip: A brilliant graduate of Raffles College, he was the key leader of MCP (Singapore). Was the superior of "The Plen" (Fang Chuang Pi)
 Fang Chuang Pi: Key leader of MCP (Singapore)
 Kamarulzaman Teh: former leader of Angkatan Pemuda Insaf (API) whom fought the Japanese during the Japanese Occupation in Malaya.
 Mohd Yatim Ayob: former communist fighter at Kg. Bharu, Telaga Nenas, Manjung, Perak.

See also
List of political parties in Malaysia
Malayan Communist Party (Marxist–Leninist) 
Communist Party of Indonesia
Malaysian Communist Party
Malayan Communist Party (Revolutionary Faction)
North Kalimantan Communist Party

References

Citations

Sources 

 
 Chin, C. C., and Karl Hack. eds., Dialogues with Chin Peng: New Light on the Malayan Communist Party. (2004) Singapore: Singapore University Press, 2004 
 
 
 
 
 

Defunct communist militant groups
Rebel groups in Malaysia
Communist parties in Malaysia
Communism in Singapore
Comintern sections
Defunct political parties in Malaysia
Political history of Malaysia
British Malaya
Malayan Emergency
1930 establishments in British Malaya
1989 disestablishments in Malaysia
Political parties established in 1930
Political parties disestablished in 1989
Banned communist parties
Defunct communist parties
Anti-Japanese resistance movement in Malaya during World War II
Defunct political parties in Singapore
Maoist parties